Lemuel Phillips Padgett (November 28, 1855 – August 2, 1922) was an American politician and a member of the United States House of Representatives for the 7th congressional district of Tennessee.

Biography
Born in Columbia, Tennessee, in Maury County, Padgett was the son of John B. and Rebecca Ophelia (Phillips) Padgett. He attended the private schools in that county and graduated from Erskine College at Due West, South Carolina, in 1876. Having begun the study of law in September 1876, he was admitted to the bar in March 1877.

Career
Padgett began to practice law in Columbia, Tennessee, in January 1879 and he married Ida B. Latta on November 11, 1880. He was a Presidential Elector for Tennessee, 1884, and a member of the Tennessee Senate from 1899 to 1901.

Elected as a Democrat to the Fifty-seventh and the ten succeeding Congresses, Padgett served from March 4, 1901, until his death.  During the Sixty-second through Sixty-fifth Congresses, he was the chairman of the United States House Committee on Naval Affairs. A thorough and studious man, he took his job seriously. He became like a walking encyclopedia about all things naval.

Death
Padgett died in Washington, D.C., on August 2, 1922 (age 66 years, 247 days). He is interred at Rose Hill Cemetery in Columbia, Tennessee.

See also
Politics of the United States
List of United States Congress members who died in office (1900–49)

References

External links
 

Democratic Party Tennessee state senators
1855 births
1922 deaths
People from Columbia, Tennessee
Erskine College alumni
Democratic Party members of the United States House of Representatives from Tennessee